Kung Fu Fighting and Other Great Love Songs is the first studio album by Jamaican disco artist Carl Douglas. It reached number one on the Billboard Soul LPs chart and number 37 on Billboard'''s overall Top LPs & Tape chart in 1975. 
In Europe, Asia, Africa and South America the album was released under the name Kung Fu Fighter''.

Reception

The editorial board of AllMusic Guide scored this album three out of five stars, with reviewer Alex Henderson noting that while the two lead singles of the album are novelty songs focusing on disco beats with lyrics about kung fu, "in fact, most of the tracks aren't novelty items" as "other songs have more romantic lyrics and are competent, if unremarkable, examples of Northern soul-pop".

Track listing
All songs written by Carl Douglas, except where noted
"Kung Fu Fighting" – 3:15
"Witchfinder General" – 2:56
"When You Got Love" (Biddu) – 3:31
"Changing Times" – 3:00
"I Want to Give You My Everything" (Larry Weiss) – 2:37
"Dance the Kung Fu" (Biddu and Douglas) – 3:09
"Never Had This Dream Before" (Lee Vanderbilt) – 3:10
"I Don't Care What People Say" (Biddu and Vanderbilt) – 3:36
"Blue Eyed Soul" (Biddu) – 4:49

Personnel
Carl Douglas – vocals
Stephen Allan – tape operation
Biddu – production, coordination
Robin Blanchflower – coordination
Bones – backing vocals
Richard Dodd – engineering
Gerry Shury – arrangement on all songs except "When You Got Love" and "I Don't Care What People Say"
Pip Williams – arrangement on "When You Got Love" and "I Don't Care What People Say"

Charts

References

External links

1974 debut albums
Carl Douglas albums
20th Century Fox Records albums
Albums produced by Biddu